Office of the Chief Scientist may refer to:

 Office of the Chief Scientist (Australia)
 Office of the Chief Scientist of the Israeli Ministry of Economy, a defunct government department succeeded by the Israel Innovation Authority
 Chief Scientist Office, Scotland

Chief Scientist may refer to:
 Chief scientific officer, sometimes referred to as chief scientist
 Chief technology officer, sometimes referred to as chief scientist
 Chief Technology Officer of the United States
 The Chief Scientist, in the Office of the Chief Scientist (Australia)
 Chief Scientist of South Australia
 Chief Scientist of Western Australia
 Chief Scientist of the U.S. Air Force
 NASA Chief Scientist, a position in NASA

See also
 Science advice
 Chief Scientific Adviser (disambiguation)
 Chief scientific officer